The siege of Suiyang was a military campaign during the An Lushan Rebellion, launched by the rebel Yan army to capture the city of Suiyang from the loyalist forces of the Tang army. Although the battle was ultimately won by the Yan army, it suffered a major loss of manpower and time. The battle was noted for the Tang army's determination to fight to the last man, as well as the large-scale cannibalism that occurred during the siege.

Background 

The An Lushan Rebellion started in December 755. By the end of 756, the rebel Yan army had captured most of northern China, which then included both Tang capitals, Chang'an and Luoyang, and was home to the majority of the empire's population. The Yangtze River basin had thus become the main base of the Tang dynasty's war efforts. In January 757, the newly self-proclaimed Yan emperor An Qingxu ordered general  to join forces with general Yang Chaozong and besiege Suiyang (present-day Shangqiu, Henan). Suiyang was a city on the Tang-era course of the Grand Canal, sitting midway between the major cities Kaifeng and Xuzhou. The city therefore formed a major obstacle for the rebels on the route from the capitals to the southeastern coast, the breadbasket of the Tang dynasty.

At the time, Zhang Xun, formerly a county magistrate serving in the Tang government, was the leader of volunteer defenders in Yongqiu. The Tang had granted him the title deputy jiedushi of Henan, but was unable to provide any reinforcement or logistic support. Zhang had held off a rebel siege on his city in the previous year. However, as cities in the area fell one by one, Zhang quickly realized that his position in Yongqiu was becoming untenable. Recognizing the strategic importance of Suiyang, he led 3,000 men to aid its defence. Once he arrived, Zhang Xun took over the military leadership of Suiyang. , the county magistrate of Chengfu, also arrived to help lead the defence of Suiyang. Meanwhile, Yin Ziqi mustered an army of 130,000 and started besieging the city in late January.

Beginning 
The united army of Zhang Xun and Xu Yuan, around 6,800 men, prepared to defend Suiyang with their lives. Xu Yuan focused on supplies management and after-battle repairs. Zhang Xun, on the other hand, focused on battle tactics.

Despite daily sieges by the Yan army, the Tang soldiers never let up. Zhang Xun's troops played the battle drums during the night, acting as if they were going to fight. Consequently, the Yan army were forced to stand on guard during the night, and suffered from lack of sleep. Eventually, some troops did not bother to put on their armor when they heard these battle drums, and kept sleeping. The ambush was successful and 5,000 Yan troops were slaughtered.

Zhang Xun had long wanted to give Yan morale a major blow, and the best way to do this would be to hurt or kill the Yan general Yin Ziqi. However, Zhang Xun did not know what Yin Ziqi looked like, not to mention he would be in a mix of soldiers. Zhang Xun therefore turned to psychology. He ordered his troops to shoot weeds, instead of arrows, at a few enemy soldiers. When these soldiers noticed that they were being shot by weeds and left unharmed, they were overjoyed. They promptly ran to Yin Ziqi to report that the Tang army had already run out of arrows. Zhang Xun noticed where the soldiers ran and ordered his best archer, Nan Jiyun, to shoot at Yin Ziqi. One such arrow hit Yin Ziqi in his left eye, throwing the Yan army instantly into chaos. The siege ended with the expected major blow to Yan morale.

After 16 days of siege and ambush, the Yan army had already lost 20,000 men. Yin Ziqi decided that his army was too tired to fight, so he ordered a temporary retreat to regroup. Yin Ziqi returned to besiege Suiyang two months later, with an additional 20,000 fresh troops.

Originally, Xu Yuan had prepared for the upcoming battle by storing a year's worth of food inside of Suiyang. But the district governor had insisted that he share the large food supply with other nearby fortresses, and hence the food supply became much less than what Xu Yuan originally planned. By July, the Tang soldiers had fallen into a serious food shortage. Tang soldiers were given very small daily rations of rice. If they wanted more food, they would need to settle for whatever animals, insects, and tree roots that could be found in their vicinity.

Yin Ziqi noticed the famine that was plaguing the Tang army; he therefore ordered more troops to surround Suiyang. He made many siege attempts with siege ladders, but they were all repelled by the determined Tang troops. Yin Ziqi even used hooked pulled carts, to try to pull down the towers of the fortress, with limited success. The Tang soldiers were able to destroy the hook of these carts, before major damage was made. But even with the battle success, Zhang Xun knew that with only around 1,600 soldiers left, and most of them sick or hungry, the battle would soon be a lost cause.

By August, all of the insects, animals and vegetation in the besieged area had been eaten. Zhang Xun ordered 30 of his best soldiers under Nan Jiyun to break through and ask for help from nearby fortresses. Nan Jiyun and 26 others successfully broke through. However, none of the nearby local governors were willing to offer troops and food supplies. Helan had long been jealous of Zhang Xun's abilities. He also wanted to preserve his forces, so he refused to assist Zhang Xun. Instead, he offered Nan Jiyun a large feast, to try to convince him to join his ranks. Nan replied, "The reason why I risked my life to come here is because the local civilians and my comrades have had no food to eat for over a month. How can I eat such a large feast when I know what my comrades are facing? Although I failed my mission, I will leave a finger with you, as evidence that I did come here." Immediately after, Nan Jiyun cut off (or, in some versions, bit off) one of his own fingers. Furious at Helan's inaction, he then rode away, but not before shooting an arrow at the Buddha statue in a nearby temple and stating, "Once I return from defeating the enemy, I will definitely kill Helan! This arrow shows my resolve."

Nan Jiyun's bravery finally convinced a local governor, Lian Huan, to lend 3,000 soldiers to him. Both of them fought their way through the Yan army back into Suiyang. Fighting through the numerous ranks of the Yan army was damaging, and only about 1,000 of the soldiers from the outside made it inside the fortress.

The starving Tang soldiers, numbering about 1,600 in total, fell into despair at the lack of outside help. Almost everyone tried to convince Zhang Xun to surrender, or find some way of escape south. Zhang Xun and Xu Yuan discussed this, and Xu Yuan concluded, "If Suiyang falls, Yan will be free to conquer the rest of southern China. And on top of it, most of our soldiers are too tired and hungry to run. The only choice we have left is to defend for as long as possible, and hope that a nearby governor will come and help us." Zhang Xun agreed with him. Zhang Xun announced to his remaining troops, "The nearby governors might be inelegant, but we cannot be disloyal. Another day that we can hold out is another day for the rest of the Tang to prepare defenses. We will fight till the very end."

Cannibalism 
The siege of Suiyang resulted in a prolonged state of famine, according to the Old Book of Tang, which wrote:

The New Book of Tang recorded that Xu Yuan also killed his servants, noting:

The New Book of Tang also claimed that cannibalism was practiced on a widespread level, and that such fear prevented rebellion:

Fall of Suiyang 
Tang soldiers fought until early October. Finally, with fewer than 400 men alive, and the men without the strength to shoot arrows, Suiyang fell to the Yan army. Zhang Xun said before the fall, "We are out of strength, and can no longer defend the fortress. Although we have failed the emperor in life, we hope to keep killing enemies after death."

Zhang Xun, Nan Jiyun and Xu Yuan were all captured. According to an exchange in the Zizhi Tongjian, Yin Ziqi asked Zhang Xun "I heard that every time you fight, your eyes are ripped open, and your teeth are cracked. Why?" Zhang Xun answered, "I want to swallow rebel traitors, but I cannot hear them." Yin Ziqi then used a dagger to open Zhang Xun's mouth to examine his teeth, and to his surprise, all but three or four of Zhang Xun's teeth were indeed cracked. Zhang Xun finally said, "I die for my emperor, so I will die in peace."

Unable to convince Zhang Xun to surrender, the Yan army then attempted to convince Nan Jiyun to surrender, but he refused to speak. Zhang Xun said to him, "Eighth brother Nan! All brave men face death. Do not give in to unrighteousness!" Nan Jiyun replied, "I had intended to accomplish great things (by surrendering and living on), but you know me so well. If you say so, how dare I not die?" He then refused to surrender.

Yin Ziqi admired Zhang Xun's bravery and commanding abilities, and tried unsuccessfully to persuade Zhang Xun, Nan Jiyun, and Xu Yuan to join the ranks of the Yan. Fearing further danger from his captives, Yin had all three men executed, along with 33 other loyal elite soldiers, including Lei Wanchun and Yao Kun. By the end of the siege the Yan army had lost 120,000 men in more than 400 battles for Suiyang.

Aftermath 
Zhang Xun was able to repel many overwhelming Yan attacks, despite becoming more outnumbered with each battle. Because of Zhang Xun's determination, the resource-laden southern China did not come under threat from the rebels for almost two years. With such a large Yan army held at bay, the Tang army were able to use the resources to gather more troops for combat. This gave the Tang army enough time to regroup and strike back at the Yan army.

Before the Battles of Yongqiu and Suiyang, the Yan army had intended to conquer all of the Tang dynasty. Their total army size, across the whole country, was well over 300,000 men, greatly outnumbering what the Tang army could have offered at the time. After these two battles, however, the tide had turned and the Tang army held the upper hand in both manpower and equipment. Although the Yan army emerged victorious at Yongqiu and Suiyang, it had suffered irreparable losses in those battles. If the Yan army had conquered Suiyang even one year earlier, the Tang might have ended by 757. The Suiyang campaign marked the turning point of the rebellion.

Legacy 
After the war, Zhang Xun and Xu Yuan were increasingly portraited by the imperial government and literati as icons of loyalty and patriotism. The plan by the Tang court to posthumously award Zhang Xun was originally met with controversy due to the mass cannibalism in the siege. However, it was eventually decided that his contributions to the Tang victory greatly outweighed those concerns. Shrines were constructed in honor of Zhang and Xu, first in Suiyang, and later also at the Lingyan Pavilion in Chang'an, where they were venerated alongside the most respected officials and generals in Tang history.

Tales of the heroism of the defenders were embellished in the works of famous writers and poets during the Tang-Song period, such as Gao Shi, Han Yu, Liu Zongyuan, Wang Anshi, Sima Guang, Ouyang Xiu and Huang Tingjian. A popular poem by the late Song politician Wen Tianxiang cited the stories of Zhang Xun and Xu Yuan as examples of loyalty and persistence in order to inspire resistance in the face of the Mongol invasion. The Tang, Song and Ming dynasties all organized state ceremonies in honor of Zhang and Xu; in some regions Zhang Xun was even deified and worshipped by believers of the Chinese folk religion. Meanwhile, the philosopher Wang Fuzhi harshly criticised the defenders, commenting that killing for food should not be accepted even in life or death situations.

References

Citations

Sources

Books

Journal articles 

 
 

Suiyang
Incidents of cannibalism
8th century in China
Suiyang
757
An Lushan Rebellion